The list below shows the leading Thoroughbred sire of racehorses in Germany for each year since 1867. This is determined by the amount of prize money won by the sire's progeny during the season.

 1867 - St. Giles (1)
 1868 - Lord Fauconberg (1)
 1869 - Ignoramus (1)
 1870 - King of Diamonds (1)
 1871 - Grimston (1)
 1872 - Lord Clifden (1)
 1873 - Savernake (1)
 1874 - Savernake (2)
 1875 - Buccaneer (1)
 1876 - Buccaneer (2)
 1877 - Cambuscan (1)
 1878 - Buccaneer (3)
 1879 - Savernake (3)
 1880 - Buccaneer (4)
 1881 - Savernake (4)
 1882 - The Palmer (1)
 1883 - The Palmer (2)
 1884 - Flibustier (1)
 1885 - Chamant (1)
 1886 - Chamant (2)
 1887 - Chamant (3)
 1888 - Flibustier (2)
 1889 - Flibustier (3)
 1890 - Chamant (4)
 1891 - Chamant (5)
 1892 - Chamant (6)
 1893 - Trachenberg (1)
 1894 - Kisber (1)
 1895 - Kisber (2)
 1896 - Kisber (3)
 1897 - Chamant (7)
 1898 - Fulmen (1)
 1899 - Fulmen (2)
 1900 - Fulmen (3)
 1901 - Gouverneur (1)
 1902 - Saraband (1)
 1903 - Saraband (2)
 1904 - Saphir (1)
 1905 - Saphir (2)
 1906 - Hannibal (1)
 1907 - Saphir (3)
 1908 - Calveley (1)
 1909 - Ard Patrick (1)
 1910 - Galtee More (1)
 1911 - Ard Patrick (2)
 1912 - Hannibal (2)
 1913 - Ard Patrick (3)
 1914 - Ard Patrick (4)
 1915 - Nuage (1)
 1916 - Nuage (2)
 1917 - Nuage (3)

 1918 - Dark Ronald (1)
 1919 - Dark Ronald (2)
 1920 - Dark Ronald (3)
 1921 - Dark Ronald (4)
 1922 - Dark Ronald (5)
 1923 - Fervor (1)
 1924 - Fervor (2)
 1925 - Fervor (3)
 1926 - Fervor (4)
 1927 - Prunus (1)
 1928 - Prunus (2)
 1929 - Prunus (3)
 1930 - Wallenstein (1)
 1931 - Herold (1)
 1932 - Prunus (4)
 1933 - Herold (2)
 1934 - Prunus (5)
 1935 - Oleander (1)
 1936 - Flamboyant (1)
 1937 - Oleander (2)
 1938 - Oleander (3)
 1939 - Oleander (4)
 1940 - Oleander (5)
 1941 - Oleander (6)
 1942 - Oleander (7)
 1943 - Oleander (8)
 1944 - Oleander (9)
 1945 - Aventin (1)
 1946 - Alchimist (1)
 1947 - Alchimist (2)
 1948 - Wahnfried (1)
 1949 - Arjaman (1)
 1950 - Ticino (1)
 1951 - Ticino (2)
 1952 - Ticino (3)
 1953 - Ticino (4)
 1954 - Ticino (5)
 1955 - Ticino (6)
 1956 - Ticino (7)
 1957 - Ticino (8)
 1958 - Ticino (9)
 1959 - Neckar (1)
 1960 - Neckar (2)
 1961 - Mangon (1)
 1962 - Neckar (3)
 1963 - Neckar (4)
 1964 - Neckar (5)
 1965 - Neckar (6)
 1966 - Orsini (1)
 1967 - Birkhahn (1)
 1968 - Birkhahn (2)

 1969 - Orsini (2)
 1970 - Birkhahn (3)
 1971 - Orsini (3)
 1972 - Kronzeuge (1)
 1973 - Kaiseradler (1)
 1974 - Orsini (4)
 1975 - Appiani II (1)
 1976 - Kaiseradler (1)
 1977 - Kaiseradler (2)
 1978 - Alpenkönig (1)
 1979 - Dschingis Khan (1)
 1980 - Alpenkönig (2)
 1981 - Dschingis Khan (2)
 1982 - Priamos (1)
 1983 - Frontal (1)
 1984 - Frontal (2)
 1985 - Surumu (1)
 1986 - Surumu (2)
 1987 - Nebos (1)
 1988 - Königsstuhl (1)
 1989 - Surumu (3)
 1990 - Surumu (4)
 1991 - Surumu (5)
 1992 - Surumu (6)
 1993 - Acatenango (1)
 1994 - Königsstuhl (1)
 1995 - Acatenango (2)
 1996 - Königsstuhl (2)
 1997 - Acatenango (3)
 1998 - Dashing Blade (1)
 1999 - Acatenango (4)
 2000 - Monsun (1)
 2001 - Acatenango (5)
 2002 - Monsun (2)
 2003 - Big Shuffle (1)
 2004 - Monsun (3)
 2005 - Big Shuffle (4)
 2006 - Monsun (4)
 2007 - Big Shuffle (5)
 2008 - Samum (1)
 2009 - Big Shuffle (6)
 2010 - Areion (1)
 2011 - Big Shuffle (7)
 2012 - Big Shuffle (8)
 2013 - Areion (2)
 2014 - Tertullian (1)
 2015 - Areion (3)
 2016 - Soldier Hollow (1)
 2017 - Areion (4)
 2018 - Soldier Hollow (2)
 2019 - Soldier Hollow (3)

References 
 tbheritage.com
 Beaulieu, Franz Chales de: Der Klassische Sport, 2. erweiterte Auflage, Deutscher Archiv-Verlag, Berlin, 1942, no ISBN

See also
 Leading sire in Australia
 Leading sire in France
 Leading sire in Great Britain & Ireland
 Leading sire in Japan
 Leading broodmare sire in Japan
 Leading sire in North America
 Leading broodmare sire in Great Britain & Ireland
 Leading broodmare sire in North America

Horse racing in Germany
de:Championat der Vaterpferde in Deutschland